

History
It was founded as Associated Computer Systems Institute in 1984 with its first campus at Luna, La Paz, Iloilo City. At first it offered diploma courses in computer. It changed its name to ACSI Business and Computer School, Inc, and moved to a new location at the City Proper of Iloilo.

In 2008 the college offered two CHED programs: Bachelor of Science in Computer Science and Bachelor of Science in Computer Systems. Following that, it changed its name to ACSI College. It caters both courses accredited by Technical Education and Skills Development Authority and Commission on Higher Education of the Philippines in information technology, hospitality management, health sciences, business and short term courses.

Academic programs
ACSI College has various programs in bachelor's and non-bachelor's degrees. The college is under and accredited by  CHED (Commission on Higher Education) and Technical Education and Skills Development Authority (TESDA). ACSI is a CHED Certified Higher Education Institution.

ACSI College Iloilo offers courses in regular and night classes.

Information technology
Bachelor of Science in Computer Science 
Bachelor of Science in Information Systems    
Associate in Computer Technology (TESDA Recognized)

Hospitality
Hotel and Restaurant Services (NC IV)

Health sciences
Caregiver Program/Caregiver Course (NC II)

Short term courses
AutoCAD 
Adobe Photoshop CS3, CS4, CS5 & CS6
Microsoft Office Word 2007 & 2010
Microsoft Office Excel 2007 & 2010 
Microsoft Office Groove 2007 & 2010
Microsoft Office InfoPath 2007 & 2010
Microsoft Office OneNote 2007 & 2010
Microsoft Office PowerPoint 2007 & 2010
Microsoft Office Publisher 2007 & 2010
Microsoft Office Access 2007 & 2010
Microsoft Office Outlook 2007 & 2010

Student organizations
 Rotaract Club of ACSI(Rotary Club of Midtown Iloilo): The ACSI College Iloilo chapter of Rotary International
 ACSI IT Society: An organization exclusively for IT (Information Technology)/computer courses students.

References

Universities and colleges in Iloilo City